Nonea is a genus of flowering plants in the family Boraginaceae. Sometimes known as monkswort, these are herbaceous perennials or annual plants, native to Europe, Asia and Africa.

The leaves are grayish-green, and the plants are hairy all over.

Species
Nonea includes 45 accepted species.

Nonea alpestris G.Don
Nonea anchusoides Boiss. & Buhse
Nonea anomala Hausskn. & Bornm.
Nonea armeniaca (Kusn.) Grossh.
Nonea calceolaris Nikif. & Pazij
Nonea calycina (Roem. & Schult.) Selvi, Bigazzi, Hilger & Papini
Nonea caspica (Willd.) G.Don
Nonea decurrens G.Don
Nonea dumanii Bilgili & Selvi
Nonea echioides (L.) Roem. & Schult.
Nonea edgeworthii DC.
Nonea flavescens (C.A.Mey.) Fisch. & C.A.Mey.
Nonea heterostemon Murb.
Nonea hypoleia Bornm.
Nonea intermedia Ledeb.
Nonea iranica Falat. & Pakravan
Nonea kandaharensis Riedl
Nonea karsensis Popov
Nonea longiflora Wettst.
Nonea lutea Desr.) DC.
Nonea macrantha (Riedl) A.Baytop
Nonea macropoda Popov
Nonea macrosperma Boiss. & Heldr.
Nonea melanocarpa Boiss.
Nonea micrantha Boiss. & Reut.
Nonea minutiflora Riedl
Nonea monticola (Rech.f.) Selvi & Bigazzi
Nonea ovczinnikovii Czukav.
Nonea pallens Petrovic
Nonea palmyrensis (Post) Sam.
Nonea persica Boiss.
Nonea philistaea Boiss.
Nonea pisidica Selvi, Bigazzi & Hilger
Nonea polychroma Selvi & Bigazzi
Nonea × popovii Gusul. & Tarn.
Nonea pulla (L.) DC.
Nonea pulmonarioides Boiss. & Balansa
Nonea rosea (M.Bieb.) Link
Nonea rossica Steven
Nonea setosa Roem. & Schult.
Nonea stenosolen Boiss. & Balansa
Nonea taurica Ledeb.
Nonea turcomanica Popov
Nonea versicolor (Steven) Sweet
Nonea vesicaria (L.) Rchb.
Nonea vivianii  DC.

References

External links
 Nonea info and pictures

Boraginoideae
Boraginaceae genera